In Greek mythology, Tanagra (Ancient Greek: Τανάγρα or Τάναγραν) was the daughter of Aeolus or the river-god Asopus and Metope, daughter of Ladon. In the latter case, she was considered a naiad-nymph and sister to Corcyra, Salamis, Aigina, Peirene, Kleonai, Thebe, Thespeia, Asopis, Sinope, Ornia, Chalcis, Pelasgus, and Ismenus.

Mythology 
Tanagra married Poemander, founder of the town of Tanagra in Boeotia which he named after his wife. The couple had two sons: Leucippus and Ephippus. In some accounts, Hermes fought Ares in a boxing match for the sake of Tanagra. Hermes won and carried her off to Tanagra which later bore her name.

Notes

References 

 Diodorus Siculus, The Library of History translated by Charles Henry Oldfather. Twelve volumes. Loeb Classical Library. Cambridge, Massachusetts: Harvard University Press; London: William Heinemann, Ltd. 1989. Vol. 3. Books 4.59–8. Online version at Bill Thayer's Web Site
 Diodorus Siculus, Bibliotheca Historica. Vol 1-2. Immanel Bekker. Ludwig Dindorf. Friedrich Vogel. in aedibus B. G. Teubneri. Leipzig. 1888–1890. Greek text available at the Perseus Digital Library.
 Pausanias, Description of Greece with an English Translation by W.H.S. Jones, Litt.D., and H.A. Ormerod, M.A., in 4 Volumes. Cambridge, MA, Harvard University Press; London, William Heinemann Ltd. 1918. . Online version at the Perseus Digital Library
 Pausanias, Graeciae Descriptio. 3 vols. Leipzig, Teubner. 1903.  Greek text available at the Perseus Digital Library.
 Lucius Mestrius Plutarchus, Moralia with an English Translation by Frank Cole Babbitt. Cambridge, MA. Harvard University Press. London. William Heinemann Ltd. 1936. Online version at the Perseus Digital Library. Greek text available from the same website.

Naiads
Nymphs
Deeds of Ares
Women of Hermes
Boeotian characters in Greek mythology